Nimaethap II (also Nymaathap) was an ancient Egyptian queen, most likely living in the Fifth Dynasty. She is only known from her mastaba tomb excavated by George Andrew Reisner at Giza. Apart from a false door, the cult chambers of the mastaba were undecorated. On the false door the queen bears the titles she, who sees Horus and Seth and great one of the hetes screptre. These are typical titles for queen of the Egyptian Old Kingdom. Her mastaba dates on architectural grounds to the Fifth Dynasty, but it is not possible to be more precise on the dating. Her royal husband remains therefore unknown.

References 

Queens consort of the Fifth Dynasty of Egypt
3rd-millennium BC births
3rd-millennium BC deaths